The Rajah is a 1911 silent short film directed by J. Searle Dawley and starring Marc McDermott, Miriam Nesbitt and Laura Sawyer. Distributed through the General Film Company.

Cast
Marc McDermott
Miriam Nesbitt
Laura Sawyer

References

External links
 The Rajah at IMDb.com

1911 films
American silent short films
1911 short films
Films based on short fiction
Edison Manufacturing Company films
Films directed by J. Searle Dawley
1910s American films